Neil Louis Gross (born June 1, 1971) is the Charles A. Dana Professor of Sociology and chair of the department of sociology at Colby College. He is also a visiting scholar of New York University’s Institute for Public Knowledge. He has written several books on sociological and political topics, and also blogs for The Chronicle of Higher Education. Gross edited the American Sociological Association's journal Sociological Theory from 2009 to 2015. He previously taught at the University of Southern California, Harvard University, Princeton University, and at the University of British Columbia.

Early life and education 
Gross grew up near Berkeley, California, raised by his stay-at-home mother and his father, a legal editor. Both of his parents were avid readers.

Gross earned a B.A. in Legal Studies from the University of California, Berkeley in 1992, and a Ph.D. from the University of Wisconsin-Madison in 2002. Before going to graduate school, Gross was a patrolman in the Berkeley Police Department in Berkeley, California.

Career 
From 2004 to 2008, Gross was an assistant professor of sociology at Harvard University, after which he joined the faculty of the University of British Columbia. He was the editor-in-chief of Sociological Theory for six years (2009-2015). In 2015, he left the University of British Columbia to become Charles A. Dana professor and chair of sociology at Colby College.

Biography of Richard Rorty
Gross garnered considerable attention for his 2008 book Richard Rorty: The Making of an American Philosopher, which focused on philosopher Richard Rorty, and has been described by philosopher Barry Allen as using Rorty's life to "build a theory of the sociology of ideas."  Reviewing the book, sociologist Neil Mclaughlin commended Gross for his "careful archival research, innovative theoretical synthesis and substantive contributions."

On liberalism in academia 
Another focus of Gross' work has been the political leanings of university professors. With Solon Simmons, he began in 2006 a survey of 1417 faculty members at 927 United States universities, colleges, and community colleges, called the Politics of the American Professoriate. Inside Higher Ed reported that several experts said that the survey data "may become the definitive source for understanding professors' political views." Gross published an extensive analysis of this work in the 2013 book Why Are Professors Liberal and Why Do Conservatives Care? He and Simmons further analyzed the field of research in their 2014 compilation Professors and Their Politics. Sociologist Joseph Hermanowicz described Professors and Their Politics as an important work, on a par with "Paul Lazarsfeld and Wagner Theilen's classic study of 1958 and Seymour Martin Lipset and Everett Carll Ladd's 1976 work." Gross has found, along with numerous other researchers, that there are more liberals than conservatives in university faculty, but he has also said that there is relatively little evidence that students are indoctrinated into liberal opinions during college. In a field of study where experts disagree, and some have taken opposing views specifically on Gross' methods and interpretations, he has also criticized what he sees as conservative political bias intentionally distorting the results of demographic research on campus politics.

Books 

 "Pragmatism, Phenomenology, and Twentieth-Century American Sociology" - in Sociology in America: A History, Craig Calhoun, ed. 2008. 
 Richard Rorty: The Making of an American Philosopher- 2008. 
 Social Knowledge in the Making - co-edited with Charles Camic and Michèle Lamont. 2011.
 Why Are Professors Liberal and Why Do Conservatives Care? - 2013. 
 Professors and Their Politics - co-edited with Solon Simmons. 2014.

References

External links 
 University of British Columbia - Neil Gross
 Colby College - Neil Gross

American sociologists
1971 births
Living people
Colby College faculty
Academic staff of the University of British Columbia
Harvard University faculty
University of California, Berkeley alumni
University of Wisconsin–Madison alumni
Academic journal editors